The Volta Internacional Cova da Beira (officially: Grande Prémio Internacional Beiras e Serra da Estrela) is a professional cycling race held annually in Portugal. It is part of the UCI Europe Tour in category 2.1.

Winners

References

External links
 

Cycle races in Portugal
UCI Europe Tour races
Recurring sporting events established in 2016
2016 establishments in Portugal
Spring (season) events in Portugal